The Chauncey L. Williams House, in River Forest, Illinois is a residence designed by Frank Lloyd Wright. The house was built in 1895 of Roman brick and plaster. It was one of Wright's earliest Chicago commissions.

The house reflects the influence of Japanese design on Wright, who was a collector of Japanese prints.  

Wright's client, Chauncey L. Willams, was a member of a wealthy Midwestern family; he was active in cultural and literary pursuits. With W. Irving Way, Williams formed the prestigious but short-lived Way and Williams publishing firm (1895–98). Wright and Williams had attended the University of Wisconsin together and remained friends afterward. The two men co-operated in literary pursuits.

References

 Storrer, William Allin. The Frank Lloyd Wright Companion. University Of Chicago Press, 2006,  (S.033)

External links
A site about Chauncey Williams House

Houses completed in 1895
Houses in Cook County, Illinois
Frank Lloyd Wright buildings
River Forest, Illinois